Musa schizocarpa is a species of wild banana (genus Musa). It is native to New Guinea.

References

schizocarpa
Flora of New Guinea